Liefdefjorden is a fjord in Haakon VII Land on Spitsbergen, Svalbard. Former names of the fjord include Baye d'Amour, Kjærlighedsbugten, Porto detto l'Amato, Liefde Bay and Love Bay. Monacobreen debouches into the fjord. At the northern side of the outer part of the fjord is the peninsula Reinsdyrflya. Liefde is Dutch for "love" and the fjord is possible named after a ship "de Liefde".

References

Fjords of Spitsbergen